Boneh-ye Mohammad Ali (also Romanized as Boneh-ye Moḩammad ʿAlī) is a village in Chelo Rural District, Chelo District, Andika County, Khuzestan Province, Iran. At the 2006 census, its population was 29, in 5 families.

References 

Populated places in Andika County